The Athabasca Basin is a region in the Canadian Shield of northern Saskatchewan and Alberta, Canada. It is best known as the world's leading source of high-grade uranium and currently supplies about 20% of the world's uranium.

The basin is located just to the south of Lake Athabasca, west of Wollaston Lake, and encloses almost all of Cree Lake. The uranium ore is mostly found at the base of this sandstone, at the point where it meets the basement.

On the northern and eastern edges are the communities of Fort Chipewyan in Alberta and Camsell Portage, Stony Rapids, Fond du Lac, Black Lake and Wollaston Lake in Saskatchewan. Much of the Athabasca Basin is within the migratory range of the Beverly caribou herd  a major source of sustenance for the Denesuline communities.

Within the basin are the Athabasca Sand Dunes Provincial Park on the south shore of Lake Athabasca and the Carswell crater. The Cluff Lake mine site is located in the crater area.
 
Points North Landing, a permanent supply depot and camp, serves the eastern area of the basin.

Road access to the area is provided by Saskatchewan Highway 955 from the village of La Loche on the west side and Saskatchewan Highway 914 and Saskatchewan Highway 905 north of the town of La Ronge on the east side.

Uranium mines

Uranium was discovered in the region in the 1940s. The first mine in the area was the Rabbit Lake Mine, which was discovered in 1968 by Gulf Mineral Resources and opened in 1975.  The most important current mine is Cameco's McArthur River mine, the world's largest high-grade uranium mine. 
Other uranium mines in the Athabasca Basin include the Cigar Lake Mine, the Key Lake mine and the McClean Lake mine. Former mines include the Cluff Lake mine and Gunnar mine.

Dikes in the Athabasca Basin are related to the giant Mackenzie dike swarm.

See also
List of uranium projects
Geology of Saskatchewan

References

External links
Map of the Beverly and Qamanirjuaq caribou range 
Aerial exploration of the Carswell impact structure and maps of the Athabasca Basin
Uranium in Canada
Athabasca Basin, Saskatchewan
Uranium in Alberta
Overview of Athabascan Unconformity Uranium deposits

Landforms of Saskatchewan
Landforms of Alberta
Uranium mines in Canada
Geology of Saskatchewan
Geology of Alberta